Ido-Osi is a town located in Ekiti State, Nigeria.

The local government is full of rural towns and villages and is one of the local government districts of Ekiti State. It is very close to other local districts, including Moba, Ijero, Ilejemeje and Ado. The local government headquarters is hosted by Ido with the secretariat sited in between Ido town and Usi.

Local Government Areas in Ekiti State
Local Government Areas in Yorubaland